Dezpart County is in Khuzestan province, Iran. The capital of the county is the city of Dehdez. At the 2006 census, the region's population (as Dehdez District of Izeh County) was 23,745 in 4,337 households. The following census in 2011 counted 21,482 people in 4,591 households. At the 2016 census, the district's population was 19,351, in 4,762 households. Dehdez District was separated from Izeh County on 27 July 2021.

Administrative divisions

The population history of Dezpart County's administrative divisions (as Dehdez District of Izeh County) over three consecutive censuses is shown in the following table.

References

Counties of Khuzestan Province

fa:شهرستان دزپارت